Osvaldo Alcaide (born 26 May 1965) is a Puerto Rican windsurfer. He competed in the men's Division II event at the 1988 Summer Olympics.

References

External links
 

1965 births
Living people
Puerto Rican male sailors (sport)
Puerto Rican windsurfers
Olympic sailors of Puerto Rico
Sailors at the 1988 Summer Olympics – Division II
Place of birth missing (living people)
20th-century Puerto Rican people